Nirmal Singh Dhunsi ( born 1960) is a Punjabi-Norwegian artist. He is known for associating two different cultures, the East (India) and the West (Norway), in his paintings.

Biography 
Dhunsi was born in 1960 in village Jandiala Manjki in Jalandhar district of Punjab, India. He migrated to Norway in 1984 and joined the Trondheim Academy of Fine Arts in 1987. He is currently based in Trondheim, Norway.

Since 2008, he has been receiving the minimum guaranteed income for artists from the Government of Norway.

His work is included in the permanent collection of the Nasjonalmuseet, Norway.

References

External links 

 Official website

Punjabi artists
1960 births
Living people
People from Trondheim
20th-century Norwegian painters
Norwegian male painters
21st-century Norwegian painters
20th-century Norwegian male artists
21st-century Norwegian male artists